Events in the year 1750 in Norway.

Incumbents
Monarch: Frederick V

Events
11 September - Jacob Benzon is appointed Vice Steward of Norway.
16 December - The Norwegian Military Academy is founded.
The construction of Fredriksvern naval base was finished.

Arts and literature

The construction of Frogner Manor is finished.
The oldest written account of Selma, a legendary sea serpent in Lake Seljord.

Births
15 May - Christian Jensen Lofthuus, revolutionary peasant leader (died 1797)

Deaths

See also